The 1640s decade ran from January 1, 1640, to December 31, 1649.

References